The Damon Marsh is a tidal wetland at the northern edge of San Leandro Bay in Oakland, California, USA. One end of this trailhead lies at Damon Slough. Access to the marsh is via the Hegenberger Road exit of Interstate 880. A 1989 biological study of the Damon Marsh found that this habitat supports the California clapper rail (Rallus longirostros obsoletus), a federally and state-listed endangered avian species.

Notes

See also
California Least Tern
Kayaking
Salt Marsh Harvest Mouse

Landforms of Alameda County, California
Wetlands of the San Francisco Bay Area
Marshes of California